Sudden Jim is a 1917 American silent drama film directed by Victor Schertzinger and starring Charles Ray, Joseph J. Dowling and Sylvia Breamer.

Cast 
 Charles Ray as James Ashe, Jr. 
 Joseph J. Dowling as Judge Zanaan Frame 
 Sylvia Breamer as Marie Ducharme 
 Lydia Knott as Widow Stickney 
 William Ellingford as Steve Gilders 
 Georgie Stone as The Kid

References

Bibliography
 Goble, Alan. The Complete Index to Literary Sources in Film. Walter de Gruyter, 1999.

External links
 

1917 films
1917 drama films
1910s English-language films
American silent feature films
Silent American drama films
Films directed by Victor Schertzinger
American black-and-white films
Triangle Film Corporation films
1910s American films